Varsovia, the New Latin word for Warsaw, Poland, has been the name of two distinct EuroCity international express trains, each of them originating and terminating in Warsaw.

Routes
The first Varsovia ran between Warsaw and Berlin, Germany.  Introduced in 1993, it was absorbed, minus its name, into the EuroCity Berlin-Warszawa-Express service in 2002.

In 2012, a second Varsovia was introduced to link Warsaw with Budapest, Hungary, as an extended replacement for the EC Moravia, which had run only between Ostrava in the Czech Republic and Budapest.

See also
 Vindobona (train)

 History of rail transport in the Czech Republic
 History of rail transport in Germany

 History of rail transport in Poland
 History of rail transport in Slovakia
 List of EuroCity services
 List of named passenger trains of Europe

References

EuroCity
International named passenger trains
Named passenger trains of the Czech Republic
Named passenger trains of Germany
Named passenger trains of Hungary
Named passenger trains of Poland
Named passenger trains of Slovakia
Railway services introduced in 1993
Railway services discontinued in 2002
Railway services introduced in 2012